Problepsis achlyobathra is a species of moth of the  family Geometridae. It is found in Sumatra, Peninsular Malaysia, Borneo, Java and Sulawesi.

Subspecies
Problepsis achlyobathra achlyobathra
Problepsis achlyobathra emphyla Prout, 1938 (Sulawesi)
Problepsis achlyobathra violescens Prout, 1934 (Java)

References

External links
The Moths of Borneo

Scopulini
Moths described in 1928
Moths of Asia